Libertine is a type of silver coin forged and used in the Republic of Ragusa that had its capital city in Dubrovnik. It was minted between 1791 and 1795. The motto for the Republic was Libertas meaning freedom hence the name of the coin.

External links 
 http://www.hr/croatia/economy/money/history
 https://web.archive.org/web/20061022035043/http://www.hnb.hr/novcan/povijest/h-nastavak-3.htm 
 http://www.hnz.hr/proizvod_opsirno.asp?pageID=256&pID=343

Coins of the Republic of Ragusa
Medieval currencies